In the Battle of Sig (26-27 June 1835), French forces, assisted by the Douair and Smela tribes, fought the Algerian resistance led by Emir Abdelkader in the forest of Moulay-Ismaël near Sig for 2 days.

Unable to resist the Algerian assault, the men of General Camille Alphonse Trézel eventually retreated. A second retreat took place at Arzew but Trézel's forces were swiftly overtaken. The Algerian cavalry, faster, more mobile and above all more numerous, blocked the French at the Macta. While the Foreign Legion succeeded in containing the attackers and pushing them back, the Algerians continued their attacks. The French forces lost 52 men and 189 were wounded on the first day.

On June 28, the Algerian forces ambushed the French at the Macta marshes which are formed by the confluence of the Sig and the Habra, between the river and the forest. The heavy wagons of the convoy were destroyed and the injured soldiers from the previous night's battle were slaughtered. The troops were also annihilated. The Foreign Legion stepped in again, freeing the way toward Arzew. The attack by the Algerian horsemen cost the French forces, with 262 men killed and 300 wounded on the second day.

See also 
 Emir Abdelkader
 Emirate of Abdelkader
 French Algeria
 French conquest of Algeria
 Sig

References 

Battles involving France
Battles involving Algeria
French Algeria
1835 in Algeria
Conflicts in 1835
19th century in Africa
Battles involving the French Foreign Legion
June 1835 events